Eperatus of Pharae in Achaea was an Ancient Greek general of the 3rd century BC.

He was elected strategos of the Achaean League in 219 BC. This was done by the intrigues of Apelles, the adviser of Philip V of Macedon, and in opposition to Timoxenus, who was supported by Aratus of Sicyon. Eperatus was held universally in low estimation, and was in fact totally unfit for his office, on which he entered in 218 BC, so that, when his year had expired, he left numerous difficulties to Aratus, who succeeded him.

References

Footnotes 

Ancient Greek generals
Ancient Achaeans
3rd-century BC Greek people
Achaean League